Russell Pysklywec is a professor and former department chair of Earth Sciences at the University of Toronto. His research focus is on the evolution of the earth shell, the crust, and lithospheric mantle.

References 

Canadian geologists
Academic staff of the University of Toronto
Living people
1970 births